Daniel Brickley (born March 30, 1995) is an American professional ice hockey defenseman who is currently playing for Modo Hockey in the HockeyAllsvenskan (Allsv).

Playing career
Brickley played for Skyline High School, winning back to back state championships in 2010 and 2011.

Brickley played Junior A for the Hawkesbury Hawks in the CCHL in Canada in the 2013-2014 season.  He was recruited to play Major Junior for Gatineau and Erie but opted to keep his NCAA eligibility and stayed in Hawkesbury  He was awarded the team's Defenseman of The Year award.

Brickley played in the North American Hockey League (NAHL) with the Topeka RoadRunners where he was selected in the first round with Topeka's top pick in the NAHL draft. He committed to a collegiate career with Minnesota State University of the WCHA on November 19, 2014.

In his sophomore season with the Mavericks in the 2016–17 season, Brickley led the blueline on a top-pairing role. He collected 31 points in 31 games finishing as the WCHA's leading scorer amongst defenseman, earning selection to the conference First All-Star Team and Defensive Player of the Year honors. Brickley was subsequently honored as a Second Team All-American, and gained attention as a top undrafted NHL free agent. Brickley opted to continue his college career, returning to MSU for his junior season.

At the completion of his junior season with the Minnesota State Mavericks in the 2017–18 season, Brickley opted to conclude his collegiate career, signing as a free agent to a two-year, entry-level contract with the Los Angeles Kings on March 31, 2018. He made his NHL debut with the Kings, and recorded his first NHL point, on April 6, 2018, in a game against the Minnesota Wild.

During the 2019–20 season, re-assigned to Ontario of the AHL, Brickley was hampered by injury. He appeared in 11 games registering just 2 assists before he was re-assigned by the Kings to join the Manitoba Moose, primary affiliate of the Winnipeg Jets, on loan for the remainder of the season on March 2, 2020.

As a free agent from the Kings following the  season, Brickley continued his career in the AHL, agreeing to a one-year contract with the Chicago Wolves, affiliate to the Carolina Hurricanes, on September 1, 2021. In the following 2021-22 season, Brickley split the year between the Wolves and the Norfolk Admirals of the ECHL.

On July 13, 2022, Brickley opted to sign his first European contract, agreeing to a one-year contract with Swedish second tier club, Västerviks IK of the Allsvenskan.  He made his Allsvenskan debut in Västerviks first game of the season on September 23, 2022, against Tingsryds AIF. He provided an assist for Marcus Vela's decisive goal in overtime.

International play
Brickley made his Team USA debut participating for the American national team at the 2017 IIHF World Championship in Germany/France.

Personal life
His uncle Andy Brickley played for and is currently the TV color analyst for the Boston Bruins on NESN  and his cousin Connor Brickley also played in the NHL for the New York Rangers.  Daniel's father was a minor league linesman for 13 years in the IHL, AHL and ECHL.

Career statistics

Regular season and playoffs

International

Awards and honors

References

External links

1995 births
Living people
American men's ice hockey defensemen
Chicago Wolves players
Los Angeles Kings players
Manitoba Moose players
Minnesota State Mavericks men's ice hockey players
Norfolk Admirals (ECHL) players
Ontario Reign (AHL) players
People from Sandy, Utah
Ice hockey people from Utah
Undrafted National Hockey League players
AHCA Division I men's ice hockey All-Americans
Minnesota State University, Mankato alumni